Caroline van Renterghem (born 31 January 1972) is a Belgian former professional tennis player.

A Federation Cup player for Belgium in 1988 and 1989, van Renterghem reached a career high singles ranking of 261 in the world. She featured twice in the main draw of the Belgian Open, including in 1988 when she was beaten in the first round by top seed Zina Garrison.

ITF finals

Singles: 1 (1–0)

Doubles: 2 (1–1)

References

External links
 
 
 

1972 births
Living people
Belgian female tennis players
20th-century Belgian women